Caterpillar 924G is a small size wheel loader manufactured by Caterpillar Inc. Introduced in the year 2000, it remained in production until 2008. The Caterpillar 924G is the first loader in the nine-twenty-four series to feature the Versalink 1 piece boom, which offers greater strength and superior visibility for the operator compared to early designs. The 924G was replaced by the 924H in 2008.

References

924